A by-election was staged in the New South Wales Legislative Assembly district of Maroubra on 17 September 2005. It was triggered by the resignation of sitting member and Premier Bob Carr. The by-election was timed to coincide with two other state by-elections in Macquarie Fields and Marrickville.

The by-election saw the Labor Party retain the seat with the election of candidate Michael Daley.

Background
On 27 July 2005, New South Wales Premier Bob Carr announced his resignation as Premier. Carr had been leader of the New South Wales Labor Party since 1988. He led the party to government at the 1995 state election and his government was subsequently re-elected at the 1999 and 2003 elections. Carr's resignation took effect on 4 August 2005. At roughly 10 years 4 months, he served the longest continuous service of any Premier of New South Wales.

Carr also resigned his parliamentary seat, triggering the by-election.

Results
Elections returns gave Labor candidate Michael Daley a comfortable victory. The opposition Liberal Party opted not to contest the seat.

See also
Electoral results for the district of Maroubra
List of New South Wales state by-elections

References

External links
 

2005 elections in Australia
New South Wales state by-elections
2000s in New South Wales